Elliot Stenmalm (born 4 May 2002) is a Swedish handball player for Industria Kielce and the Swedish national team. He is the younger brother of fellow handball player Philip Stenmalm.

He participated at the 2021 European Men's U-19 Handball Championship.

Achievements
IHF Super Globe
Bronze medal: 2022

Individual awards
 All-Star Team as Best Left Back at the 2021 European Men’s U-19 Championship
Top Goalscorer (61 goals) at the 2021 European Men’s U-19 Championship 
Top Goalscorer (172 goals) Handbollsligan 2021–22

References

External links
 Elliot Stenmalm at European Handball Federation

2002 births
Living people
Swedish male handball players
People from Växjö
Sportspeople from Kronoberg County
Redbergslids IK players
Vive Kielce players
Expatriate handball players
Swedish expatriate sportspeople in Poland
21st-century Swedish people